Pierre Aristide Faron was Governor General for Inde française in the Second French Colonial Empire under Third Republic.

Titles Held

Governors of French India
Governors of Réunion
People of the French Third Republic
Year of death missing
Year of birth missing